The Sri Lankan team toured India from 11 November to 27 December 2009, playing three Tests, five ODIs and two T20Is. The series was called the Jaypee cup.

Squads

Tour matches

Test series

1st Test

2nd Test

3rd Test

T20I series

1st T20I

2nd T20I

ODI series

1st ODI

2nd ODI

3rd ODI

4th ODI

5th ODI

Television coverage
Eurosport (live) – Europe
Fox Sports (live) – Australia
NEO Cricket (live) – India and Middle East
StarHub TV (live) – Singapore and Malaysia
Supersport (live) – South Africa
Zee Sports (live) – US
DD National (live) – India  (Only T20s and ODIs)
Geo Super (live) – Pakistan

References

2009 in Indian cricket
2009 in Sri Lankan cricket
Indian cricket seasons from 2000–01
International cricket competitions in 2009–10
2009